Héctor Ortiz (born April 5, 1933) is a retired Paraguayan football referee, born in Encarnación, Paraguay. He is known for having refereed one match in the 1982 FIFA World Cup in Spain between Northern Ireland and Spain and the first leg of the 1983 Copa América final between Uruguay and Brazil.

References
Profile

1933 births
Paraguayan football referees
FIFA World Cup referees
Living people
1982 FIFA World Cup referees
Copa América referees
People from Encarnación, Paraguay